Dewey G. Cornell is an American forensic and clinical psychologist known for his research on youth violence and school security. He is Professor of Education in the Curry School of Education at the University of Virginia, where he also holds the Bunker Chair in Education. He is the director of the University of Virginia's Virginia Youth Violence Project, as well as a faculty associate at the university's Institute of Law, Psychiatry, and Public Policy. He is the principal author of the Virginia Student Threat Assessment Guidelines, which are widely used for threat assessment in schools in the United States and Canada. Using the guidelines, he has found that 97.7% of threats made in schools were never attempted.

References

External links
Faculty Page
Psichologas Raimonda

Living people
Forensic psychologists
20th-century American psychologists
University of Virginia faculty
Transylvania University alumni
University of Michigan alumni
Educational researchers
Educational psychologists
21st-century American psychologists
Year of birth missing (living people)
American clinical psychologists
American educational psychologists